The 2013 Mississippi State Bulldogs baseball team represents Mississippi State University in the 2013 NCAA Division I baseball season.  The team is coached by John Cohen, in his 14th year as a collegiate head coach, and his 5th at Mississippi State.  The Bulldogs play their home games at Dudy Noble Field, and compete in the Southeastern Conference's West Division.

After the 2012 season, Assistant Coach Lane Burroughs leaves Mississippi State to become the head coach at Northwestern State. Nick Mingione becomes the assistant coach for the 2013 season, replacing Lane Burroughs.

After a third-place finish in the SEC West and a semifinal appearance in the 2013 Southeastern Conference baseball tournament, the Bulldogs advanced through the NCAA Tournament's Starkville Regional, Charlottesville Super Regional, and College World Series bracket to reach the College World Series final with an 8–1 record in the tournament.

MLB Draft

Roster

Schedule

Ranking movements

References

External links
 Official website

Mississippi State Bulldogs
2013 in sports in Mississippi
Mississippi State Bulldogs baseball seasons
College World Series seasons
2013 NCAA Division I baseball tournament participants